Events from the year 1645 in Sweden

Incumbents
 Monarch – Christina

Events

 First issue of Post- och Inrikes Tidningar.
 Sweden occupies Verden.
 5 March - Battle of Jankau
 Smålands nation, Uppsala is founded.
 13 August - the Torstenson War is terminated by the Second Treaty of Brömsebro (1645).
 Lennart Torstenson resigns as the leader of the Swedish army.

Births

 Haquin Spegel, religious author and hymn writer who held several bishop's seats (died 1714)

Deaths

 15 March - Johan Skytte, politician (born 1577) 
 Gese Wechel, first female director of the Swedish Post Office (born unknown)

References

 
Years of the 17th century in Sweden
Sweden